Kurt Weinreich (12 December 1908 – 8 April 1998) was a German football manager. He was the head coach of the Finland national football team from August 1955 to October 1958.

Weinreich was a former centre forward. He was signed by the Football Association of Finland in 1955. In May 1957 Weinreich made a new two-year contract, which allowed him to coach the third-tier club LPM Lahti as well. Weinreich was very popular among the players but had some conflicts with the Football Association. In October 1958 his contract was no longer renewed.

References 

1908 births
1998 deaths
German football managers
Finland national football team managers
German expatriate football managers